Norfran Adán Lazo Morales (born 8 September 1990) is a Nicaraguan footballer who plays for Real Estelí in the Primera División de Nicaragua.

Club career
He previously played for Diriangén, Managua   and Walter Ferretti. He left Ferretti in summer 2012 for Real Estelí.

International career
Lazo made his debut for Nicaragua in a January 2011 Copa Centroamericana match against Guatemala and has, as of December 2013, earned a total of 5 caps, scoring no goals. He has represented his country in 2 FIFA World Cup qualification matches and played at the 2011 Copa Centroamericana.

International goals
Scores and results list the Nicaragua's goal tally first.

References

External links
 

1990 births
Living people
Association football forwards
Nicaraguan men's footballers
Nicaragua international footballers
Diriangén FC players
Managua F.C. players
C.D. Walter Ferretti players
Real Estelí F.C. players
2011 Copa Centroamericana players
2017 Copa Centroamericana players